Chris Campbell (born 1952) is an American realist painter.

Life and work
Campbell grew up in New Orleans, Louisiana. After graduating from Louisiana State University, she earned a Doctor of Medicine degree from Tulane University School of Medicine.  She completed a radiology residency at New York University School of Medicine as well as a fellowship in nuclear medicine at Harvard Medical School.  Her career changed direction when she studied at the Art Students League of New York. In 1998 she moved to Hawaii and began painting Native Hawaiian women.  She emphasizes the bodily form and solidity of her substantial subjects as in Strike a Pose III.

Collections 
Campbell's work is held in the collections of the Hawaii State Art Museum and the Honolulu Museum of Art.

References

General references
Maui Arts & Cultural Center, Schaefer Portrait Challenge, 2015, Maui Arts & Cultural Center, 2015, pp. 14-15

External links
 

1952 births
Living people
American women painters
Hawaii artists
21st-century American women artists